Qalat (also Romanized as Qalāt and Qelāt) is a village in Jolgah Rural District, in the Central District of Jahrom County, Fars Province, Iran. At the 2006 census, its population was 263, in 71 families.

References

External links

 Qelat on Facebook

Populated places in Jahrom County